"Are Your Eyes Still Blue" is a song co-written and recorded by American country music singer Shane McAnally. It is the second single from his only studio album, Shane McAnally. He wrote the song with Julie Wood and Steve Mandile, the latter of whom would later become a member of the band Sixwire.

Content
Thematically, the song is about "a man still intrigued by his old flame and the transformation that has taken place since their parting." Throughout, the male narrator questions his former lover with "Are your eyes still blue?" The song consists of two verses, a chorus which is sung three times, and a bridge. It begins in the key of F major, then modulates upward by a whole-step at each chorus, ending in B major. It is in 2/2 or cut time with an approximate tempo of 84 half-notes per minute. Prominent mandolin and fiddle are heard throughout.

Critical reception
An uncredited review in Billboard was favorable, saying that "His sophomore single is an appealing uptempo number with a decidedly more country flavor. Production is crisp and flatters McAnally's energetic performance." Country Standard Time writer Dan McIntosh, in a review of the album, wrote that it "nicely melds fiddle and mandolin into what comes off as a sort of modern day bluegrass plucker."

Personnel
From Shane McAnally liner notes.

 Dan Dugmore – acoustic guitar, steel guitar
 Lori D. Hall – background vocals
 Tony Harrell – piano
 Rich Herring – acoustic guitar, background vocals
 Michael Lusk – background vocals
 Brent Rowan – electric guitar
 Wanda Vick – fiddle, mandolin
 Mel Watts – drums
 Glenn Worf – bass guitar

Chart performance

References

1999 songs
1999 singles
Curb Records singles
Shane McAnally songs
Songs written by Shane McAnally
Songs written by Steve Mandile